Route 59 is a bus route in England which operates between Skipton and Harrogate on Saturdays. It is operated by the Harrogate Bus Company.

History
Prior to the introduction of the 59, the X59 operated between Skipton and Harrogate. In 2011, the frequency of the service was reduced from five buses per day to two. It was withdrawn completely in 2013.

The 59 route was introduced on 22 May 2021. In April 2022, the stop at the Millstones restaurant, near Kettlesing, was dropped.

Route
The route runs from Skipton bus station to Harrogate bus station and follows the A59 road. Four journeys run in each direction on Saturdays only.

References

Bus routes in England